Leland E. Byrd (April 8, 1927 – January 19, 2022) was an American college athletic administrator, basketball player and coach. He was an All-American player at West Virginia University (WVU) and went on to serve as athletic director at several universities.

Byrd was born in Lynch, Kentucky, on April 8, 1927, and grew up in Matoaka, West Virginia. He played high school basketball for his father at Matoaka High School. Byrd enrolled at WVU in 1944, and because of a shortage of players due to World War II he was able to play as a freshman. Byrd enjoyed a four-year college career for the Mountaineers, earning All-America honors from the Helms Athletic Foundation as a junior in 1947. Following his graduation in 1948, he was drafted by the New York Knicks in the 1948 BAA draft, though he did not play for the team. Byrd was drafted into the United States Army and was eventually was commissioned a first lieutenant.

His first coaching job came at Hinton High School in his native West Virginia. From there he was hired as head basketball coach at Glenville State College and was named the school's athletic director in 1962. He then moved to a teaching position at Miami Dade College's north campus, which was quickly expanded to include assistant athletic director duties. Three years later, he was named athletic director of the school's south campus. In 1972 he was named athletic director at his alma mater WVU, replacing Red Brown. In 1979, Byrd was named as Executive Director of the Eastern Eight Conference (which became the Atlantic 10 Conference during his tenure). Byrd then became athletic director at Western Michigan where he served from 1984 to 1992.

Byrd is a member of the WVU and Glenville State athletic halls of fame. He died on January 19, 2022, at the age of 94.

References

External links
WVU Athletic HOF profile
Glenville State Athletic HOF profile

1927 births
2022 deaths
All-American college men's basketball players
American men's basketball coaches
American men's basketball players
Baseball coaches from Kentucky
Baseball players from Kentucky
Basketball coaches from West Virginia
Basketball players from West Virginia
College men's basketball head coaches in the United States
Glenville State Pioneers basketball coaches
High school basketball coaches in West Virginia
Junior college athletic directors in the United States
People from Lynch, Kentucky
People from Mercer County, West Virginia
Military personnel from Kentucky
Military personnel from West Virginia
Western Michigan Broncos athletic directors
West Virginia Mountaineers athletic directors
West Virginia Mountaineers men's basketball players